Cheshmeh Meru (also Romanized as Cheshmeh Merū and Cheshmeh Mīrū) is a village in Zarneh Rural District, Zarneh District, Eyvan County, Ilam Province, Iran. At the 2006 census, its population was 25, in 6 families. The village is populated by Kurds.

References 

Populated places in Eyvan County
Kurdish settlements in Ilam Province